My Father, the Ape and I (German: Mein Vater, der Affe und ich) is a 1971 Austrian-West German comedy film directed by Franz Antel and starring Gerhart Lippert, Mascha Gonska, Paul Löwinger.

The film's sets were designed by the art director Nino Borghi.

Cast
Gerhart Lippert as Dr. Klaus Wolf 
Mascha Gonska as Brigitte 'Biggi' Hansen 
Teri Tordai as Ruth 
Gunther Philipp as Prof. Dr. Felix Grimm 
Paul Löwinger as Kranzl 
Beppo Brem as Engelbert 
Lotte Ledl  as Karin 
Eva Maria Meineke as Mrs. Finch 
Fritz Muliar as Smekal 
Carlo Böhm as Hotel doorman
Heinz Reincke as Konsul Hansen 
Michael Holm as Self

References

External links

1971 comedy films
German comedy films
Austrian comedy films
West German films
Films directed by Franz Antel
Films scored by Gerhard Heinz
Films about apes
Constantin Film films
1970s German-language films
1970s German films